Comet Hale–Bopp (formally designated C/1995 O1) is a comet that was one of the most widely observed of the 20th century and one of the brightest seen for many decades.

Alan Hale and Thomas Bopp discovered Comet Hale–Bopp separately on July 23, 1995, before it became visible to the naked eye. It is difficult to predict the maximum brightness of new comets with any degree of certainty, but Hale–Bopp exceeded most predictions when it passed perihelion on April 1, 1997, reaching about magnitude −1.8. It was visible to the naked eye for a record 18 months, due to its massive nucleus size.  This is twice as long as the Great Comet of 1811, the previous record holder. Accordingly, Hale–Bopp was dubbed the great comet of 1997.

Discovery 
The comet was discovered independently on July 23, 1995, by two observers, Alan Hale and Thomas Bopp, both in the United States.

Hale had spent many hundreds of hours searching for comets without success, and was tracking known comets from his driveway in New Mexico when he chanced upon Hale–Bopp just after midnight. The comet had an apparent magnitude of 10.5 and lay near the globular cluster M70 in the constellation of Sagittarius. Hale first established that there was no other deep-sky object near M70, and then consulted a directory of known comets, finding that none were known to be in this area of the sky. Once he had established that the object was moving relative to the background stars, he emailed the Central Bureau for Astronomical Telegrams, the clearing house for astronomical discoveries.

Bopp did not own a telescope. He was out with friends near Stanfield, Arizona, observing star clusters and galaxies when he chanced across the comet while at the eyepiece of his friend's telescope. He realized he might have spotted something new when, like Hale, he checked his star maps to determine if any other deep-sky objects were known to be near M70, and found that there were none. He alerted the Central Bureau for Astronomical Telegrams through a Western Union telegram. Brian G. Marsden, who had run the bureau since 1968, laughed, "Nobody sends telegrams anymore. I mean, by the time that telegram got here, Alan Hale had already e-mailed us three times with updated coordinates."

The following morning, it was confirmed that this was a new comet, and it was given the designation C/1995 O1. The discovery was announced in International Astronomical Union circular 6187.

Early observation 

Hale–Bopp's orbital position was calculated as 7.2 astronomical units (au) from the Sun, placing it between Jupiter and Saturn and by far the greatest distance from Earth at which a comet had been discovered by amateurs. Most comets at this distance are extremely faint, and show no discernible activity, but Hale–Bopp already had an observable coma. A precovery image taken at the Anglo-Australian Telescope in 1993 was found to show the then-unnoticed comet some 13 au from the Sun, a distance at which most comets are essentially unobservable. (Halley's Comet was more than 100 times fainter at the same distance from the Sun.) Analysis indicated later that its comet nucleus was 60±20 kilometres in diameter, approximately six times the size of Halley's Comet.

Its great distance and surprising activity indicated that comet Hale–Bopp might become very bright when it reached perihelion in 1997. However, comet scientists were wary – comets can be extremely unpredictable, and many have large outbursts at great distance only to diminish in brightness later. Comet Kohoutek in 1973 had been touted as a 'comet of the century' and turned out to be unspectacular.

Perihelion 

Hale–Bopp became visible to the naked eye in May 1996, and although its rate of brightening slowed considerably during the latter half of that year, scientists were still cautiously optimistic that it would become very bright. It was too closely aligned with the Sun to be observable during December 1996, but when it reappeared in January 1997 it was already bright enough to be seen by anyone who looked for it, even from large cities with light-polluted skies.

The Internet was a growing phenomenon at the time, and numerous websites that tracked the comet's progress and provided daily images from around the world became extremely popular. The Internet played a large role in encouraging the unprecedented public interest in comet Hale–Bopp.

As the comet approached the Sun, it continued to brighten, shining at 2nd magnitude in February, and showing a growing pair of tails, the blue gas tail pointing straight away from the Sun and the yellowish dust tail curving away along its orbit. On March 9, a solar eclipse in China, Mongolia and eastern Siberia allowed observers there to see the comet in the daytime. Hale–Bopp had its closest approach to Earth on March 22, 1997, at a distance of 1.315 au.

As it passed perihelion on April 1, 1997, the comet developed into a spectacular sight. It shone brighter than any star in the sky except Sirius, and its dust tail stretched 40–45 degrees across the sky. The comet was visible well before the sky got fully dark each night, and while many great comets are very close to the Sun as they pass perihelion, comet Hale–Bopp was visible all night to northern hemisphere observers.

After perihelion 
After its perihelion passage, the comet moved into the southern celestial hemisphere. The comet was much less impressive to southern hemisphere observers than it had been in the northern hemisphere, but southerners were able to see the comet gradually fade from view during the second half of 1997. The last naked-eye observations were reported in December 1997, which meant that the comet had remained visible without aid for 569 days, or about 18 and a half months. The previous record had been set by the Great Comet of 1811, which was visible to the naked eye for about 9 months.

The comet continued to fade as it receded, but was still tracked by astronomers. In October 2007, 10 years after the perihelion and at distance of 25.7 au from Sun, the comet was still active as indicated by the detection of the CO-driven coma. Herschel Space Observatory images taken in 2010 suggest comet Hale–Bopp is covered in a fresh frost layer. Hale–Bopp was again detected in December 2010 when it was 30.7 au away from the Sun, and in 2012, at 33.2 au from the Sun. The James Webb Space Telescope observed Hale–Bopp in 2022, when it was 46.2 au from the Sun.

Orbital changes 

The comet likely made its previous perihelion 4,200 years ago, in July 2215 BC. The estimated closest approach to Earth was 1.4 au, and it may have been observed in ancient Egypt during the 6th dynasty reign of the Pharaoh Pepi II (Reign: 2247 – c. 2216 BC). Pepi's pyramid at Saqqara contains a text referring to an "nhh-star" as a companion of the pharaoh in the heavens, where "" is the hieroglyph for long hair.

Hale–Bopp may have had a near collision with Jupiter in early June 2215 BC, which probably caused a dramatic change in its orbit, and 2215 BC may have been its first passage through the inner Solar System from the Oort cloud. The comet's current orbit is almost perpendicular to the plane of the ecliptic, so further close approaches to planets will be rare. However, in April 1996 the comet passed within 0.77 au of Jupiter, close enough for its orbit to be measurably affected by the planet's gravity. The comet's orbit was shortened considerably to a period of roughly 2,399 years, and it will next return to the inner Solar System around the year 4385. Its greatest distance from the Sun (aphelion) will be about 354 au, reduced from about 525 au.

The estimated probability of Hale-Bopp's striking Earth in future passages through the inner Solar System is remote, about 2.5×10−9 per orbit. However, given that the comet nucleus is around 60 km in diameter, the consequences of such an impact would be apocalyptic. Weissman conservatively estimates the diameter at 35 km; an estimated density of 0.6 g/cm3 then gives a cometary mass of 1.3×1019 g. At a probable impact velocity of 52.5 km/s, impact energy can be calculated as 1.9×1032 ergs, or 4.4×109 megatons, about 44 times the estimated energy of the K-T impact event.

Over many orbits, the cumulative effect of gravitational perturbations on comets with high orbital inclinations and small perihelion distances is generally to reduce the perihelion distance to very small values. Hale–Bopp has about a 15% chance of eventually becoming a sungrazing comet through this process.  If such is the case, it could undergo huge mass loss, or break up into smaller pieces like the Kreutz sungrazers.  It would also be extremely bright, due to a combination of closeness to the Sun and nuclei size, potentially exceeding Halley’s Comet in 837 AD.

Scientific results 
Due to the massive size of its nucleus, Comet Hale–Bopp was observed intensively by astronomers during its perihelion passage, and several important advances in cometary science resulted from these observations. The dust production rate of the comet was very high (up to 2.0 kg/s), which may have made the inner coma optically thick. Based on the properties of the dust grains—high temperature, high albedo and strong 10 μm silicate emission feature—the astronomers concluded the dust grains are smaller than observed in any other comet.

Hale–Bopp showed the highest ever linear polarization detected for any comet. Such polarization is the result of solar radiation getting scattered by the dust particles in the coma of the comet and depends on the nature of the grains. It further confirms that the dust grains in the coma of comet Hale–Bopp were smaller than inferred in any other comet.

Sodium tail 

One of the most remarkable discoveries was that the comet had a third type of tail. In addition to the well-known gas and dust tails, Hale–Bopp also exhibited a faint sodium tail, only visible with powerful instruments with dedicated filters. Sodium emission had been previously observed in other comets, but had not been shown to come from a tail. Hale–Bopp's sodium tail consisted of neutral atoms (not ions), and extended to some 50 million kilometres in length.

The source of the sodium appeared to be the inner coma, although not necessarily the nucleus. There are several possible mechanisms for generating a source of sodium atoms, including collisions between dust grains surrounding the nucleus, and "sputtering" of sodium from dust grains by ultraviolet light. It is not yet established which mechanism is primarily responsible for creating Hale–Bopp's sodium tail, and the narrow and diffuse components of the tail may have different origins.

While the comet's dust tail roughly followed the path of the comet's orbit and the gas tail pointed almost directly away from the Sun, the sodium tail appeared to lie between the two. This implies that the sodium atoms are driven away from the comet's head by radiation pressure.

Deuterium abundance 
The abundance of deuterium in comet Hale–Bopp in the form of heavy water was found to be about twice that of Earth's oceans. If Hale–Bopp's deuterium abundance is typical of all comets, this implies that although cometary impacts are thought to be the source of a significant amount of the water on Earth, they cannot be the only source.

Deuterium was also detected in many other hydrogen compounds in the comet. The ratio of deuterium to normal hydrogen was found to vary from compound to compound, which astronomers believe suggests that cometary ices were formed in interstellar clouds, rather than in the solar nebula. Theoretical modelling of ice formation in interstellar clouds suggests that comet Hale–Bopp formed at temperatures of around 25–45 kelvins.

Organics 
Spectroscopic observations of Hale–Bopp revealed the presence of many organic chemicals, several of which had never been detected in comets before. These complex molecules may exist within the cometary nucleus, or might be synthesised by reactions in the comet.

Detection of argon 
Hale–Bopp was the first comet where the noble gas argon was detected. Noble gases are chemically inert and vary from low to high volatility. Since different noble elements have different sublimation temperatures, and don't interact with other elements, they can be used for probing the temperature histories of the cometary ices. Krypton has a sublimation temperature of 16–20 K and was found to be depleted more than 25 times relative to the solar abundance, while argon with its higher sublimation temperature was enriched relative to the solar abundance. Together these observations indicate that the interior of Hale–Bopp has always been colder than 35–40 K, but has at some point been warmer than 20 K. Unless the solar nebula was much colder and richer in argon than generally believed, this suggests that the comet formed beyond Neptune in the Kuiper belt region and then migrated outward to the Oort cloud.

Rotation 
Comet Hale–Bopp's activity and outgassing were not spread uniformly over its nucleus, but instead came from several specific jets. Observations of the material streaming away from these jets allowed astronomers to measure the rotation period of the comet, which was found to be about 11 hours 46 minutes.

Binary nucleus question 
In 1997 a paper was published that hypothesised the existence of a binary nucleus to fully explain the observed pattern of comet Hale–Bopp's dust emission observed in October 1995. The paper was based on theoretical analysis, and did not claim an observational detection of the proposed satellite nucleus, but estimated that it would have a diameter of about 30 km, with the main nucleus being about 70 km across, and would orbit in about three days at a distance of about 180 km. This analysis was confirmed by observations in 1996 using Wide-Field Planetary Camera 2 of the Hubble Space Telescope which had taken images of the comet that revealed the satellite.

Although observations using adaptive optics in late 1997 and early 1998 showed a double peak in the brightness of the nucleus, controversy still exists over whether such observations can only be explained by a binary nucleus. The discovery of the satellite was not confirmed by other observations.

UFO claims 

In November 1996, amateur astronomer Chuck Shramek of Houston, Texas took a CCD image of the comet which showed a fuzzy, slightly elongated object nearby. His computer sky-viewing program did not identify the star, so Shramek called the Art Bell radio program Coast to Coast AM to announce that he had discovered a "Saturn-like object" following Hale–Bopp. UFO enthusiasts, such as remote viewing proponent and Emory University political science professor Courtney Brown, soon concluded that there was an alien spacecraft following the comet.

Several astronomers, including Alan Hale, stated that the object was simply the 8.5-magnitude star SAO141894. They noted that the star did not appear on Shramek's computer program because the user preferences were set incorrectly. Art Bell claimed to have obtained an image of the object from an anonymous astrophysicist who was about to confirm its discovery. However, astronomers Olivier Hainaut and David Tholen of the University of Hawaii stated that the alleged photo was an altered copy of one of their own comet images.

Thirty-nine members of the Heaven's Gate cult committed mass suicide in March 1997 with the intention of teleporting to a spaceship which they believed was flying behind the comet.

Nancy Lieder, who claims to receive messages from aliens through an implant in her brain, stated that Hale–Bopp was a fiction designed to distract the population from the coming arrival of "Nibiru" or "Planet X", a giant planet whose close passage would disrupt the Earth's rotation, causing global cataclysm. Her original date for the apocalypse was May 2003, which passed without incident, but various conspiracy websites continued to predict the coming of Nibiru, most of whom tied it to the 2012 phenomenon. Lieder and others' claims of the planet Nibiru have been repeatedly debunked by scientists.

Legacy 
Its lengthy period of visibility and extensive coverage in the media meant that Hale–Bopp was probably the most-observed comet in history, making a far greater impact on the general public than the return of Halley's Comet in 1986, and certainly seen by a greater number of people than witnessed any of Halley's previous appearances. For instance, 69% of Americans had seen Hale–Bopp by April 9, 1997.

Hale–Bopp was a record-breaking comet—the farthest comet from the Sun discovered by amateurs, with the largest well-measured cometary nucleus known after 95P/Chiron, and it was visible to the naked eye for twice as long as the previous record-holder. It was also brighter than magnitude 0 for eight weeks, longer than any other recorded comet.

Carolyn Shoemaker and her husband Gene, both famous for co-discovering comet Shoemaker–Levy 9, were involved in a car crash after photographing the comet. Gene died in the crash and his ashes were sent to the Moon aboard NASA's Lunar Prospector mission along with an image of Hale–Bopp, "the last comet that the Shoemakers observed together".

See also 
 Comet Hyakutake
 Hale Bopp (Waterhouse), a 1997 string orchestra composition 
 Lists of comets

References

External links 

 CometBase: Comet Hale-Bopp
 Cometography.com: Comet Hale-Bopp
 NASA Hale-Bopp page
 Shadow and Substance.com: Static orbital diagram
 Comet Nucleus Animation
 
 

Discoveries by amateur astronomers
Non-periodic comets
Heaven's Gate (religious group)
1997 in science
19950723
Great comets